Yury Teplov (born 1931) is a retired water polo player who competed for the Soviet Union. He competed in the men's tournament at the 1952 Summer Olympics.

References

External links
 

1931 births
Possibly living people
Soviet male water polo players
Olympic water polo players of the Soviet Union
Water polo players at the 1952 Summer Olympics
Place of birth missing (living people)